Ahmed Mostafa WalidEl-Awady (born 12 December 1985 ) is an Egyptian former handball player who competed at the Olympics in 1992 and 1996, where they ranked 11th and 6th, respectively. In October 2015, he was working as an Uber driver in Charlotte, North Carolina. He drove Liza Minnelli 200 miles on Uber to not miss her concert after her flight had been cancelled.

In early 2020 he started a relationship with Habiba khaled after breaking up with yasmine abdelaziz for her, which began a feud with her brother in disagreement over the relationship. Despite the feud, the couple married in Ramadan May, 2020.

References

External links
 

1970 births
Living people
Egyptian male handball players
Handball players at the 1992 Summer Olympics
Handball players at the 1996 Summer Olympics
Olympic handball players of Egypt
Egyptian emigrants to the United States
20th-century Egyptian people